Acaena ovalifolia is a species of flowering plant belonging to the family Rosaceae.

Its native range is Western South America to Falkland Islands.

The plant has been used to treat unspecified medicinal disorders.

References

ovalifolia
Taxa named by José Antonio Pavón Jiménez